The City of Geelong West was a local government area about  west of the regional city of Geelong, Victoria, Australia.

History

Geelong West was first incorporated as a borough on 29 May 1875, and became a town on 22 March 1922. After annexing the Moorpanyal Riding of the Shire of Corio on 9 December 1926, to form its fourth ward (West Ward), it was proclaimed as a city on 17 April 1929.

On 18 May 1993, the City of Geelong West was abolished, and along with the Cities of Geelong and Newtown, the Rural City of Bellarine, the Shire of Corio and parts of the City of South Barwon and the Shires of Barrabool and Bannockburn, was merged into the newly created City of Greater Geelong.

Wards

The City of Geelong West was divided into four wards, each of which elected three councillors:
 Little Scotland Ward
 Ashby Ward
 Kildare Ward
 Manifold Ward

Geography

The City was bounded by La Trobe Terrace to the east, Aberdeen, Minerva and Autumn Streets to the south, McCurdy Road to the west and Church Street, Western Oval and Coxon and Bell Parades to the north. It included the suburbs of Geelong West, Drumcondra, Herne Hill and Manifold Heights.

The Town Hall was located at the corner of Pakington and Albert Streets, Geelong West.

Population

* Estimate in the 1958 Victorian Year Book.

References

External links
 Victorian Places - Geelong West

Geelong West City
1993 disestablishments in Australia
1875 establishments in Australia
City of Greater Geelong